Luo Wei (born May 23, 1983 in Beijing) is a female Chinese taekwondo practitioner who competed at the 2004 Summer Olympics. She won the gold medal in the women's under 67 kg taekwondo competition.

References

External links
 
 
 

1983 births
Living people
Chinese female taekwondo practitioners
Olympic gold medalists for China
Olympic taekwondo practitioners of China
Sportspeople from Beijing
Taekwondo practitioners at the 2004 Summer Olympics
Asian Games medalists in taekwondo
Olympic medalists in taekwondo
Taekwondo practitioners at the 2002 Asian Games
Taekwondo practitioners at the 2006 Asian Games
Medalists at the 2004 Summer Olympics
Asian Games gold medalists for China
Asian Games bronze medalists for China
Medalists at the 2002 Asian Games
Medalists at the 2006 Asian Games
World Taekwondo Championships medalists
21st-century Chinese women